Michael Loftus (born 9 August 1929) is an Irish former Gaelic footballer, referee and Gaelic games administrator. His league and championship career at senior level with the Mayo county team lasted four seasons from 1949 until 1953.

Early life
He first played competitive Gaelic football with St Muredach's College in Ballina. Loftus simultaneously came to prominence with the Crossmolina club at underage levels, before later winning a county senior championship medal with the senior team in 1949. He studied at University College Galway, where he played for the university football team and won three Sigerson Cup medals.

Loftus made his debut on the inter-county scene at the age of seventeen when he was selected for the Mayo minor team. He enjoyed one championship season with the minor team, however, he ended the year as an All-Ireland runner-up. Loftus subsequently joined the Mayo junior team, winning All-Ireland medals in 1950 and in 1957 as captain. By this stage he had also joined the Mayo senior team, making his debut during the 1949-50 league. Over the course of the next four years, Loftus played on a number of occasions and won an All-Ireland medal as a non-playing substitute in 1951.

GAA Administrator
In retirement from playing, Loftus became a referee at club and county level. He took charge of the All-Ireland finals in 1965 and 1968.

Loftus also served in an administrative capacity with the Gaelic Athletic Association. He was chairman of the Connacht Council and the Centenary Committee before serving as president of the GAA from 1985 until 1988.

He was conferred with a Legum Doctor (honoris causa) by NUI Galway on 20 February 2015.

Honours
 University College Galway
 Sigerson Cup (2): 1949, 1951

 Crossmolina
 Mayo Senior Football Championship (1): 1949

 Mayo
 All-Ireland Senior Football Championship (1): 1951
 All-Ireland Junior Football Championship (2): 1950, 1957
 Connacht Junior Football Championship (2): 1950, 1957

References

 

1929 births
Living people
All-Ireland Senior Football Championship Final referees
Alumni of the University of Galway
Chairmen of Gaelic games governing bodies 
Connacht Provincial Council administrators
Crossmolina Gaelic footballers
Gaelic football forwards
Gaelic football referees
Gaelic games administrators 
Mayo inter-county Gaelic footballers
University of Galway Gaelic footballers
Presidents of the Gaelic Athletic Association
20th-century Irish medical doctors
21st-century Irish medical doctors